What If...? is an American animated anthology series created by A. C. Bradley for the streaming service Disney+, based on the Marvel Comics series of the same name. It is the fourth television series in the Marvel Cinematic Universe (MCU) produced by Marvel Studios, and the studio's first animated series from Marvel Studios Animation. The series explores alternate timelines in the multiverse that show what would happen if major moments from the MCU films occurred differently. Bradley serves as head writer for the first two seasons, with Bryan Andrews directing.

Jeffrey Wright stars as the Watcher, who narrates the series, alongside many MCU film actors reprising their roles. Marvel Studios was developing the series for Disney+ by the end of 2018, with Bradley and Andrews on board. It was officially announced in April 2019. Marvel Studios' head of visual development Ryan Meinerding helped define the series' cel-shaded animation style, which was designed to reflect the films and take inspiration from classic American illustrators. Animation for the first season is provided by Blue Spirit, Squeeze, Flying Bark Productions, and Stellar Creative Lab, with Stephan Franck as head of animation.

The first season of What If...? premiered on August 11, 2021, and ran for nine episodes until October 6 as part of Phase Four of the MCU. A second nine-episode season is expected to be part of Phase Five, and a third season is in development. The series has received generally positive reviews, with praise for the voice acting, animation, creative storylines, and scenarios, although the episode length and writing received some criticism. A Marvel Zombies series, based on one of the What If...? episodes, is in development.

Premise 
Following the establishment of the multiverse in the season one finale of Loki, What If...? explores various alternate timelines across the multiverse in which major moments from the Marvel Cinematic Universe (MCU) films occur differently, as observed by the Watcher. In the second season, following the formation of the Guardians of the Multiverse, the Watcher continues to explore more strange worlds, meeting new heroes and keeping the multiverse safe.

Episodes

Season 1 (2021)

Season 2  

An episode, written by Ryan Little and directed by Andrews, will introduce an original MCU character named Kahhori, a young Mohawk woman who seeks to discover her powers after the Tesseract crash-lands in the Haudenosaunee Confederacy in pre-colonial America.

Cast and characters 
The series is narrated by Jeffrey Wright as the Watcher, a member of the alien Watcher race who observes the multiverse, in a similar role to Rod Serling's in The Twilight Zone. Head writer A. C. Bradley said the character is "above everything else" and compared him to a viewer of the "pizza rat" video, observing and not interfering as he has "no interest in becoming friends with the rat, living amongst the rat, or doing rat things... That is the Watcher's relationship with humanity." Executive producer Brad Winderbaum felt Wright's performance inspired a sense of humanity while explaining the episodes, and Bradley explained that Wright was cast because his voice mixes power, charisma, and authority with a "warm personality". Wright approached the character like he would a live-action role, learning as much as he could about the Watcher so his voice could reflect the character's "uniquely powerful, all-seeing, sagely presence". Wright chose a contemporary American accent rather than having the character sound like "some Oxford-educated, old, fusty guy in a tudor parlor somewhere", and, aside from researching the character's comic book appearances, took inspiration from the series' tone, visuals, and animation when developing the character's voice. The comic book name "Uatu" is not used in the series because this would imply that there was more than one being watching the series' events when Bradley instead wanted to focus on the narrative of "the Watcher" observing the different characters and realities and how those affect him.

Each episode features different versions of characters from the MCU films, with many actors reprising their roles for the series. The final two episodes bring together characters from earlier episodes to form the "Guardians of the Multiverse", including Benedict Cumberbatch as Doctor Strange Supreme, Hayley Atwell as Peggy Carter / Captain Carter, Lake Bell as Natasha Romanoff / Black Widow, Chadwick Boseman as Star-Lord T'Challa, Michael B. Jordan as Killmonger, and Chris Hemsworth as Thor. Other new versions of characters who also return for the finale include Kurt Russell's Ego and Brian T. Delaney's Peter Quill from the second episode, Tom Hiddleston's Loki and Samuel L. Jackson's Nick Fury from the third, Ozioma Akagha's Shuri from the sixth, and Toby Jones's Arnim Zola and Ross Marquand's Ultron from the eighth. Additionally, Cynthia McWilliams and Mick Wingert reprise their respective roles of Gamora and Tony Stark / Iron Man from an episode that was cut from the first season but will be included in the second.

The second season sees the introduction of a young Mohawk woman named Kahhori, who is an original MCU character.

Production

Development 
By September 2018, Marvel Studios was developing several series for its parent company Disney's streaming service, Disney+; Marvel Studios President Kevin Feige was set to take a "hands-on role" in each series' development, focusing on "handling" the actors who would be reprising their roles from the Marvel Cinematic Universe (MCU) films. One of these was an animated series for Disney+ based on the Marvel Comics run What If...?. The anthology series, which would be produced by Feige, would explore how the MCU would be altered if certain events had occurred differently, such as if Loki wielded Thor's hammer Mjolnir. The hope was to have the actors who portray the characters in the MCU films voice them in the series as well. A. C. Bradley was suggested as head writer for the series by Marvel Studios executive Jonathan Schwartz after unsuccessfully pitching as a writer for Captain Marvel (2019). Bradley was eager to write a Marvel film due to her love for the franchise, and felt What If...? was her opportunity to create many Marvel stories. Marvel Studios was impressed that some of Bradley's ideas for the series matched concepts they were planning for films, and she joined the project in October 2018. Bryan Andrews, a storyboard artist on many of the major action sequences from the MCU films, met with Brad Winderbaum—the Marvel Studios executive in charge of the series—about directing the series as early as 2018. Bradley and Andrews were officially announced in their roles in August 2019.

In April 2019, Disney and Marvel officially announced the series. Marvel Studios had discussed adapting the What If...? comics in the past, but decided not to do so until after the conclusion of the Infinity Saga so they would have enough storylines to create alternate options of. Making the series animated allowed the studio to explore all of these ideas "unbounded". Winderbaum said it was not a coincidence that the series was set for release so soon after the first season finale of Loki, which introduced the multiverse, since What If...? explores facets of the multiverse in a way that Winderbaum believed made the series as important as any other MCU property; Bradley confirmed that all episodes of the series are canon to the MCU multiverse, with most of the episodes taking place in their own universe. Since work began on What If...? before the development of Loki and Doctor Strange in the Multiverse of Madness (2022), Bradley was unsure how those projects would be exploring and explaining the MCU version of the multiverse. She chose to focus on the possibilities within the alternate timelines of the multiverse, which she described as a "sampler of assorted chocolates", and left elements such as the Time Variance Authority to be explained by those other projects. Feige and Winderbaum kept the creative teams of Loki and Multiverse of Madness informed of what was happening in What If...? as work on those projects began. The creative team of What If...? met with Loki executive producers Stephen Broussard and Kevin Wright as well as WandaVision (2021) co-executive producer Mary Livanos to establish a "rule book" regarding the multiverse, its branch timelines, and nexus events.

Executive producers for the series include Winderbaum, Feige, Louis D'Esposito, Victoria Alonso, Andrews, and Bradley, with Carrie Wassenaar producing. The episodes are approximately 30 minutes in length. In December 2019, Feige revealed that the first season would consist of 10 episodes, and that work had already begun on a second 10-episode season. However, because of the production delays caused by the COVID-19 pandemic, the tenth episode of the first season was not completed in time and moved to the second season; the second season was also reduced to nine episodes. In July 2021, ahead of the release of What If...?, Alonso noted that Marvel Studios was creating an "animation branch and mini studio", known as Marvel Studios Animation, to focus on more animated content beyond What If...?.

Work on a third season began by July 2022, when Bradley revealed that the second season was her final project with Marvel Studios. During Marvel Studios Animation's panel at the 2022 San Diego Comic-Con, What If...? and the other projects discussed were introduced as being part of the "Marvel Animated Multiverse".

Writing 
Feige explained with the series' announcement that it would take "pivotal moments" from throughout the MCU and change them. For example, the first episode features Peggy Carter taking the Super Soldier Serum instead of Steve Rogers. Winderbaum felt it was "creatively healthy" to think of What If...? as its own parallel world that "lives and breathes on its own terms" and did not need to have exact adaptions from the main MCU or comics. He added that it was liberating to work within the multiverse concept because the series could take greater risks or opportunities that other MCU projects are not afforded when they are concerned with connecting to future properties. Alonso said the series was an opportunity to introduce more diversity to the MCU and take advantage of more of the 6,000 characters that Marvel Studios had access to. The writers were initially unsure if they could use Spider-Man in the series due to Sony Pictures owning the character's live-action film rights, but they were ultimately allowed to. Marvel Comics characters who have yet to appear in the MCU are not introduced in the series, but the writers considered creating new characters if it helped the story.

Before considering "what if" scenarios, the writers examined all of the MCU heroes to determine "what makes them tick". They wanted to ensure that there was story potential beyond the inciting "what if" change of each episode, so they could use the different scenarios to explore "the hero behind the shield". Bradley described the series' balance between character examination and action as "Die Hard (1988) meets Wes Anderson". 30 potential episodes were conceived and written by Bradley, Andrews, Winderbaum, story editor Matthew Chauncey, junior executive Simona Paparelli, and script coordinator Ryan Little. The What If...? comics provided inspiration for potential story points, as did the Ultimate Marvel comic book imprint (which told alternate stories to the main Marvel universe) since it was an example of a fully realized alternate universe. Bradley first created simple scenarios out of concern for the series' budget, but was told by Marvel to "go nuts". Feige chose his favorite concepts from the 30 options, which were then narrowed down to the 10 episodes for the first season. After each episode was incorrectly rumored to focus on one film from the Infinity Saga, Bradley clarified that multiple films and characters would be represented in each episode and most of the characters from all the films would appear throughout the season. Winderbaum hoped the episodes would intrigue viewers to revisit the original films, like how reading a What If comic could lead a reader to the original comic story.

Each episode and its alternate storyline is introduced and concluded by the Watcher, presenting it as "a cautionary tale in the spirit of The Twilight Zone". The episode's tones vary, with some being darker or lighter than the MCU films that they play off. For example, one episode is a political thriller, the episode centered on Stephen Strange is a "dark... tragic love story", and another allowed Bradley to "goof off" and draw inspiration from films she enjoyed when growing up such as Can't Hardly Wait (1998) and the National Lampoon films. What If...? also has a horror, a heist, and a murder mystery episodes. Various films served as touchstones for each episode, such as 1940s serials and war films for the Peggy Carter episode. Some of the writers' concepts were rejected because they matched with story ideas that Marvel already planned to use, such as Professor Hulk, an older Steve Rogers, and Pepper Potts in the Rescue suit, who all appear in Avengers: Endgame (2019); Loki becoming a hero as he does in Loki; Jane Foster becoming Thor, which was planned for Thor: Love and Thunder (2022); and an episode that was "half the [planned] plot" of Guardians of the Galaxy Vol. 3 (2023). Other unused pitches include an episode where Spider-Man turns into a real spider that was deemed "too dark and too body horror" for Marvel's target PG-13/TV-14 rating; a Jurassic Park (1993)-inspired episode featuring the Avengers as dinosaurs during prehistory; and a crossover with Star Wars characters like Luke Skywalker.

Despite the series' anthology format, the writers conceived a story device for the first season that allowed them to have some connectivity between the episodes; this begins to be revealed in the season's eighth episode before the finale in the ninth. Additionally, after the Watcher begins the season distant and appearing in the background, he becomes more apparent as the season progresses. Bradley likened the character to the audience, since "as he suffers [the heroes] triumphs and their tragedies, he becomes also more emotionally invested, and therefore becomes more and more part of their world and wants to be more part of their world even though he knows he's not supposed to". Each episode also ends with a twist or question that could potentially be resolved in a sequel episode, similar to the MCU films' post-credit scenes, though these endings are also a reference to the twist endings of the What If...? comics that were not always resolved. Bradley called these endings "fun" while differentiating them from post-credit teasers which she considered "a promise". Many of the endings for the first season's episodes are resolved in the final episode of the season. Regarding the dark tones and tragic plot points of the first season, Bradley explained that being able to feature things that would never happen in the live-action MCU, such as killing off heroes, was the "most liberating part" of the series, and that some of the episodes ended in tragedy for reasons tied into the first season's overall plan.

As the writers were developing the scripts, they realized that Captain Carter would "bubble up and became more important" alongside the Watcher, and decided to revisit her story in each future season. Bradley was asked to only explore "what if" concepts for existing MCU stories, so Phase Four characters do not appear until the second season. Some of the initial 30 concepts that were not chosen for the first season also appear in future seasons. Andrews noted that following the first season, in which the "what if" concept were only small changes from what was established, further seasons were able to "expand out" beyond these small moments and "get a little bit wackier".

Casting and voice recording 

Marvel's plan for the series was to have actors who portray characters in the MCU films reprise their roles in What If...?, with more than 50 doing so. Feige revealed half of these actors at San Diego Comic-Con in July 2019: Michael B. Jordan as Erik "Killmonger" Stevens, Sebastian Stan as James "Bucky" Barnes, Josh Brolin as Thanos, Mark Ruffalo as Bruce Banner / Hulk, Tom Hiddleston as Loki, Samuel L. Jackson as Nick Fury, Chris Hemsworth as Thor, Hayley Atwell as Peggy Carter / Captain Carter, Chadwick Boseman as Star-Lord T'Challa, Karen Gillan as Nebula, Jeremy Renner as Clint Barton, Paul Rudd as Scott Lang, Michael Douglas as Hank Pym / Yellowjacket, Neal McDonough as Dum Dum Dugan, Dominic Cooper as Howard Stark, Sean Gunn as Kraglin Obfonteri, Natalie Portman as Jane Foster, David Dastmalchian as Kurt, Stanley Tucci as Abraham Erskine, Taika Waititi as Korg, Toby Jones as Arnim Zola, Djimon Hounsou as Korath the Pursuer, Jeff Goldblum as the Grandmaster, Michael Rooker as Yondu Udonta, and Chris Sullivan as Taserface. Feige also announced that Jeffrey Wright had been cast as the Watcher, who narrates the series. Boseman was one of the first actors to agree to appear in the series.

Voice recording began by August 2019 and continued into early 2020, taking place remotely when on-site work at the Walt Disney Studios lot was suspended during the COVID-19 pandemic. Wright did some recording in a make-shift recording studio at his home. In January 2021, Frank Grillo said he had worked on the series, reprising his role of Brock Rumlow. Additional voice recording was planned for February. By July, Seth Green was reprising his role as Howard the Duck, as was Andy Serkis as Ulysses Klaue.

Ahead of the series' premiere, additional actors were revealed to be reprising their roles in the series, including Angela Bassett as Ramonda, Benedict Cumberbatch as Dr. Stephen Strange and Doctor Strange Supreme, Benedict Wong as Wong, Benicio del Toro as Taneleer Tivan / The Collector, Bradley Whitford as John Flynn, Carrie Coon as Proxima Midnight, Clancy Brown as Surtur, Clark Gregg as Phil Coulson, Cobie Smulders as Maria Hill, Danai Gurira as Okoye, Don Cheadle as James Rhodes, Emily VanCamp as Sharon Carter, Evangeline Lilly as Hope van Dyne, Georges St-Pierre as Georges Batroc, Jaimie Alexander as Sif, John Kani as T'Chaka, Jon Favreau as Harold "Happy" Hogan / Zombie Happy, Kat Dennings as Darcy Lewis, Kurt Russell as Ego, Leslie Bibb as Christine Everhart, Ophelia Lovibond as Carina, Paul Bettany as Vision and J.A.R.V.I.S., Rachel House as Topaz, Rachel McAdams as Christine Palmer, Tilda Swinton as the Ancient One, and Tom Vaughan-Lawlor as Ebony Maw.

In July 2021, Variety reported that several characters, such as Tony Stark, Steve Rogers, and Carol Danvers, would be voiced by different actors than those who portrayed them in MCU films. Winderbaum attributed some of the replacements to scheduling conflicts with the original actors, and explained that the creatives did not want the series to be "defined by the actors we thought we could get". When casting replacements, they looked to prioritize the performance for this series over an actor sounding the same as the original. He felt the series' exploration of the multiverse gave a "cerebral justification" for the different actors. Dave Bautista, who portrays Drax in the films, indicated that he was not asked by Marvel to be a part of the series, despite the character's inclusion. Winderbaum expressed surprise at Bautista's claims, assuming that there was some miscommunication at some point as all MCU actors were asked through their agents or directly to participate in the series. Josh Keaton voices Skinny Steve Rogers / Hydra Stomper and Steve Rogers; Ross Marquand voices Johann Schmidt / Red Skull and Ultron; Fred Tatasciore voices Drax, Corvus Glaive, and Volstagg; Brian T. Delaney voices Peter Quill; Lake Bell voices Natasha Romanoff / Black Widow; Mick Wingert voices Tony Stark / Iron Man; Stephanie Panisello voices Betty Ross; Mike McGill voices Thaddeus Ross; Alexandra Daniels voices Carol Danvers / Captain Marvel; Hudson Thames voices Peter Parker / Spider-Man; Kiff VandenHeuvel voices Obadiah Stane; Beth Hoyt voices Pepper Potts; Ozioma Akagha voices Shuri; Josette Eales voices Frigga; David Chen voices Hogun; Max Mittelman voices Fandral; and Cynthia McWilliams voices Gamora.

In November 2022, Cate Blanchett was revealed to be reprising her role as Hela for the second season.

Animation 

Stephan Franck serves as head of animation on the series, which features a cel-shaded animation style with character likenesses based on the actors from the films. Ryan Meinerding, the head of visual development at Marvel Studios, developed the animation style for the series with Andrews. They considered using different styles for each episode, or basing the look on comic art by Jack Kirby or Steve Ditko, before settling on a single style inspired by classic American illustrators such as J. C. Leyendecker, Norman Rockwell, Tom Lovell, and Mead Schaeffer. Andrews felt this resulted in a "kind of heroic, hyper-realized, super-idealized look that feels iconic" while not being "pushed or cartoony", while Meinerding felt this was a unique approach to translating cinematic superheroes into animation that took advantage of the medium's stylization without losing the realistic, "monumental and powerful" feeling of the films. Disney's Lady and the Tramp (1955) was also an influence due to its lack of "harsh line work" and because they felt it was "beautifully painted". Traditional 2D animation was considered, but was abandoned when Marvel could not find studios who could handle the necessary work. Instead, the animation is "2.5D", with 3D models rendered with 2D lighting to appear like flat drawings.

Alonso said the medium of animation allowed Marvel Studios to work with new companies around the world. Blue Spirit worked on two of the first season's episodes, with Squeeze handling animation for four episodes, Flying Bark Productions working on four, and Stellar Creative Lab working on one. Bradley said Marvel was "trying to use the color palette, the lighting, [and] the character design to tell as much story as you can" like they do in live-action films, adjusting the camera and color palettes between each episode. Production Designer Paul Lasaine and his team painted all of the backgrounds for the series, basing these on frames from the films as well as the concept art and set plans from those productions. Discussing the apparent exaggeration of action and abilities in the series, Franck said they were trying to be consistent with what is seen in the films, but "every medium has its own poetry and reads differently, and there's a level of abstraction and exaggeration that is inherent to animation". Andrews enjoyed the opportunity to mix his knowledge of animation with the MCU, believing there was "an embarrassment of riches" in the storytelling they were able to achieve. Graham Fisher and Joel Fisher edit the series, starting during the storyboard phase.

The series' opening title sequence was designed by Perception, who sought to emphasize the series' themes by displaying "the beauty and idea of space". The sequence draws inspiration from the work of film poster artist Bob Peak, particularly his artwork for Star Trek: The Motion Picture (1979) and Excalibur (1981), and uses imagery of glass shattering to symbolize the branching of the Sacred Timeline.

Music 

By October 2020, Laura Karpman was set to compose music for the series, which she called "the perfect composer playground" since she was able to reference existing MCU scores but also deviate from them. Karpman and the producers were inspired by Alan Silvestri's approach to the Avengers: Endgame score for how to incorporate existing music from different MCU films. She explained that Silvestri weaved his own music into other composer's themes, and generally just touched on different elements from the existing music, so her approach for the series became "touch on [existing themes], then go on". Karpman had access to the sheet music and recordings of previous MCU scores but also adapted some elements by ear. For each episode, she looked at how the story aligned with the MCU, how it deviated from the MCU, and what the story itself required musically.

When writing the series' main theme, Karpman knew that the opening sequence would feature images of shattered glass. She recorded the sound of shattering glass and manipulated it to create sound effects that were added to the theme. The main melody is played on a French horn, with Karpman singing in the background as a reference to 1960s science fiction scores that featured female vocalists. Additional choir is also used in the main theme, singing phrases backwards such as "what if", "Marvel", and "Stan Lee". Soundtrack albums for each episode of What If...?, featuring Karpman's score, were released digitally by Marvel Music and Hollywood Records. The first episode's album was released on August 13, with subsequent albums releasing shortly after their corresponding episode.

Karpman is joined by her wife Nora Kroll-Rosenbaum to compose the second season.

Marketing 
Footage from the series' first episode was shown during the D23 2019, with footage from the series also included in Expanding the Universe, a Marvel Studios special that debuted on Disney+ on November 12. The first trailer was released in December 2020. Based on the trailer, io9s James Whitbrook felt the series was "looking great". Chris Evangelista at /Film also thought it looked "pretty damn cool" and felt What If...? was a good "excuse to essentially blow up the MCU as we know it and tell completely new, weirder stories that would never get their own feature films". Writing for Polygon, Petrana Radulovic felt the trailer showed "the full extent of [narrative] possibilities". An extended look at the first episode of the series was shown during the Women In Animation panel at the Annecy International Animation Film Festival in June 2021. Also in the month, Hyundai Motor Company partnered with Marvel Studios for a marketing campaign to promote the Hyundai Tucson along with What If...?, WandaVision, The Falcon and the Winter Soldier, and Loki. The commercials were produced by Marvel and were meant to tell an "in-world" story set within the narrative of the series. The What If...? commercial was released in August 2021, which saw Party Thor driving the Hyundai Tucson into a battle against Ultron's robots with Captain Carter, Star-Lord T'Challa, and Doctor Strange Supreme. Adam Bentz at Screen Rant felt Hyundai's "Question Everything" campaign was the perfect match for What If...? and its concept, and added the content of the commercial likely was not a spoiler for the series, since the ads for the other MCU series did not correlate with actual plot lines. Barney Goldberg, executive creative director of Innocean, the creative agency working with Hyundai, noted there was "an incredible amount of coordination" to get the ad released at the proper time, in order for them to be relevant and not too late, while not spoiling aspects of the series.

An official trailer and poster for the first season were released on July 8, 2021. Nick Romano of Entertainment Weekly felt they provided more insight into the various "what if" stories the series would be exploring, and said it would be "one to watch" along with MCU films that explore the multiverse like Spider-Man: No Way Home (2021) and Doctor Strange in the Multiverse of Madness. Chaim Gartenberg at The Verge called the trailer "the best look yet" at the series. Writing for Screen Rant, Rachel Labonte said the trailer was a "wild ride" and felt like "almost every MCU character imaginable is glimpsed for at least a few seconds... it's clear there are a lot of exciting stories ahead". Vanessa Armstrong of /Film said she was not a fan of animation, but, after seeing the trailer, believed What If...? would "convert a lot of folks [like her] who are resistant" to the medium. Armstrong was "excited to see how these different realities play out" and noted the impressive amount of content and questions that were posed in the trailer. Three episodes of the series Marvel Studios: Legends were released on August 4, exploring Peggy Carter, the Avengers Initiative, and the Ravagers using footage from their MCU film appearances.

In January 2021, Marvel announced their "Marvel Must Haves" program, which reveals new toys, games, books, apparel, home decor, and other merchandise related to each episode of What If...? following an episode's release. In July, Funko Pops, Lego sets, and Marvel Legends figures based on the series were revealed. The "Must Haves" merchandise for the episodes began on August 13, 2021.

Release 
What If...? debuted on Disney+ on August 11, 2021; the first season consists of nine episodes that were released weekly until October 6. It is part of Phase Four of the MCU. A second season will also consist of nine episodes, and was originally announced to be released in early 2023, though by February 2023, the season was reportedly unlikely to premiere that year as Disney and Marvel Studios were re-evaluating their content output. It will be part of Phase Five. Winderbaum said it was their intention to release a new season of What If...? annually.

Reception

Critical response 

The review aggregator website Rotten Tomatoes reports a 94% approval rating with an average rating of 7.90/10, based on 103 reviews for the first season. The site's critical consensus reads: "What If...? may not add much to the larger MCU narrative, but surprising takes on beloved characters and some of the best action sequences in the entire franchise make for engaging viewing." Metacritic, which uses a weighted average, assigned the first season a score of 69 out of 100 based on 16 critics, indicating "generally favorable reviews".

Liz Shannon Miller at Collider, reviewing the first three episodes, felt the series lived up to the promise of showing "totally fresh but familiar spins" on the MCU. Regarding the animation, though Miller felt at times it "lacks depth" and wished varying styles were used to fit each story being told, the action sequences were "beautifully executed, with an extra bit of comic book flare to heighten the reality of the show, enhancing the whole aesthetic". For Miller, while some of the returning voice actors were not able to capture "the essence of their characters" as well as others, simply having them return enhanced the series, with praise also going to the new actors voicing established characters and noting Wright was a "pitch-perfect" casting as the Watcher. She concluded that What If...? was "seriously an MCU superfan's dream at times, though once you get past the initial discovery of each short's "What if...", it's sometimes hard to stay invested". Giving the first three episodes 3.5 out of 5 stars, Alan Sepinwall of Rolling Stone said the series was "uneven in the way almost any anthology series is. It's fun simply because the level of quality control at Marvel is pretty high these days... and because some of the ideas are either inherently appealing or are used to cleverly tweak what we know from the films. But not every installment lives up to the title's seemingly limitless potential." In his review of the first three episodes, Tyler Hersko from IndieWire felt the series was a "paradox" since it was both "the  Marvel Cinematic Universe title yet" while also "the first MCU installment in years that doesn't feel burdened by the need to meticulously fit into the franchise's canon or blatantly tease future installments". He called this "a breath of fresh air", with What If...? "offer[ing] the fans exactly what they want while still clinging to a few surprises", presenting plenty of in-universe references and jokes for long time fans, while still creating standalone stories that could appeal to all viewers. Hersko called the animation "an absolute pleasure to witness in motion", and gave the episodes a "B+".

The Hollywood Reporters Angie Han believed "for a series set in the infinite vastness of a multiverse, What If…? is dreaming awfully small", with some "what if" concepts were not as compelling as others. She added that Wright gave each episode "a boost of gravitas", but noted the animation was awkward at times, with some scenes approaching the uncanny valley and that some of the returning actors gave "robotic" voice performances without the charisma of their live-action portrayals. She concluded, "Dare to hope for more than superficial amusement, though, and What If…? tends to disappoint... It's possible future episodes will do a better job of balancing big concepts with a half-hour run time, or that the season is building to some grander design. If that's the case, What If…? is taking its sweet time showing what it can do." Etan Anderson of /Film called the results of the first three episodes "mixed" with "some glaring shortcomings", such as the "clunky" animation when it was not showing action sequences, the voice acting from some of the returning stars, and the short run times which did not allow enough time for viewers to "fully engage" with these new versions of characters. Anderson added that some of the humor struggled and felt "awkwardly contrived" and believed "the creators seem to be trying too hard to keep the secrets of the series instead of being more forthcoming about the exciting twists and turns within". He concluded that this appeared to be the first Marvel Studios series that might not be "necessary viewing" and one that could be "an uphill battle" for general audiences to continue watching, though dedicated fans would find What If...? to be "a satisfying remix". Following the release of the first season, Adam B. Vary of Variety said the season had been "a fascinating experiment for Marvel Studios", with "fizzy adventures... [that] also leaned into real darkness".

Accolades

Documentary special 

In February 2021, the documentary series Marvel Studios: Assembled was announced. The special on this series, Assembled: The Making of What If...?, goes behind the scenes of the making of the series, and was released on Disney+ on October 27, 2021.

Future

Marvel Zombies 
In November 2021, a Marvel Zombies animated series was announced, with Andrews returning to direct and Zeb Wells serving as head writer, focusing on "a new generation of heroes" battling zombies. It is a continuation of the reality first introduced in the fifth episode of the series, that "look[s] at that universe with a different lens". It is scheduled to debut on Disney+ in 2024, and will consist of four episodes.

Potential projects 
Winderbaum said there was potential for the variant characters in the series to appear in live-action, just as "what if" concepts from the Marvel Comics eventually made their way into the main comics continuity. Andrews and Hayley Atwell both expressed interest in a live-action film starring the latter as Captain Carter, though Atwell wanted the right creative team that could "pave the way for [Carter] to tap into the cultural consciousness of today and become a modern heroine of our times". Atwell first reprised the role in live-action in Doctor Strange in the Multiverse of Madness as an alternate version of the character from Earth-838 (separate from the versions seen in What If...? and the main MCU) who is a member of the Illuminati. A spin-off series centered on Star-Lord T'Challa had been in development but was left in "limbo" after Boseman's death.

Notes

References

External links 

 
 
 

 
2020s American animated television series
2020s American anthology television series
2020s American science fiction television series
2021 American television series debuts
American animated action television series
American animated adventure television series
American animated science fiction television series
American animated superhero television series
American animation anthology series
Animated series produced by Marvel Studios
Animated television series based on Marvel Comics
Annie Award winners
Cel-shaded animation
Disney+ original programming
Marvel Cinematic Universe: Phase Four television series
Marvel Cinematic Universe: Phase Five television series
Primetime Emmy Award-winning television series
Television series about multiple time paths
Television series about parallel universes
Television series by Marvel Studios